This is a list of monarchs deposed in the 17th century.

Aceh Darussalam
Baginda Seri Sultana Zinatudin Kemalat Shah, deposed in 1699 by her husband, Sayid Umar (later Sultan Badrul Alam) with support of the Grand Mufti from Mecca

Beaumont
Henry IV of France, Duke of Beaumont; Beaumont was merged into the Crown of France in 1607

Bohemia
Rudolf II, King of Bohemia, deposed 1611
Ferdinand II, King of Bohemia, deposed 1619, restored 1620
Frederick, King of Bohemia, deposed 1620

Cambodia
Brhat Sri Saravajna Samdach Naranatha Brhat Pada Samdach Sdach Brhat Rajankariya Brhat Paramaraja Ramadipati Brhat Sri Suriyabarna Dharmika Rajadhiraja Parama Chakrapatra Mahadhiptindra Narindra Rattanakasa Upasajati Mahisvara Akka Maha Parasratna Vivadhanadiraksha Ekkaraja Maha Madhankula Kumbul Krung Kambuja Adipati Maha Puriratna Sanditya Mukutya Bumindra Indipati Gururatta Raja Mandisala Mahasthana Brhat Paramanatha Parama Bupatiya Amachas Jivitha Ludhibana Paramaraja VII, King of Cambodia, (referred to as Paramaraja VII) abdicated 1618

Diois
Henry IV of France, Count of Diois (1589–1601); Diois was merged into the Crown of France

England
Charles I, King of England, lost the English Civil War and executed in 1649
James II, King of England, considered to have ceased to reign from December 1688, officially deposed February 1689 in the Glorious Revolution

Halvad
Shri Shaktimant Jhaladipati Mahamandleshwar Maharana Sriraj Jaswantsinhji I Gajsinhji Sahib Bahadur, Maharana Raj Sahib of Halvad, expelled 1673, restored 1683

Hungary
Rudolf II, King of Hungary, deposed 1609

Ireland
James II, King of Ireland, deposed 1689, made effective 1690

Jembal
Raja Sakti I ibni al-Marhum Sultan 'Abdu'l Kadir, Raja of Kelantan-Utara (Jembal) and Kelantan-Patani, Raja of Jembal (1632–1649)
Tuan Putri Sa'adong binti Raja Loyor Putri Vijaya Mala, Raja of Jembal (1663–1667).

Johor
Paduka Sri Sultan 'Ala' ud-din Ri'ayat Shah III Zillu'llahi fil-Alam ibni Paduka Sri Sultan Ali Jalla 'Abdu'l Jalil Shah, Sultan of Johor (1597–1614, 1615)

Macedonia
Karposh, Duke of Kumanovo and King of Macedonia, killed by the Ottoman Empire, 1689.

Mecca
Sharif Idris II, Sharif of Mecca, abdicated 1610.
Sharif Muhsin I bin Husain, Sharif of Mecca, deposed 1628.
Sharif Ahmad bin Talib al-Hasan, Sharif of Mecca, deposed 1629.
Sharif 'Abdu'llah I bin Hasan, Sharif of Mecca, abdicated 1631.
Sharif Hamud bin 'Abdu'llah bin Hasan I, Grand Sharif of Mecca, deposed 1670.
Sharif 'Abu'l Barakat III, Grand Sharif of Mecca, deposed 1682.
Sharif Ibrahim bin Muhammad, Grand Sharif of Mecca, deposed 1684.
Sharif Ahmad bin Zeid, Grand Sharif of Mecca, deposed 1671, reinstated 1684.
Sharif Ahmad bin Ghalib, Grand Sharif of Mecca, deposed 1690.
Sharif Muhsin bin Ahmad, Grand Sharif of Mecca, deposed 1668, restored 1689, re-deposed 1690.
Sharif 'Abdu'llah II bin Hashim, Grand Sharif of Mecca, deposed 1694.
Sharif Sa'ad Pasha, Grand Sharif of Mecca, deposed 1672, restored 1693, re-deposed 1694, restored 1694, re-deposed 1702.

Minden
Christian von Braunschweig-Lüneburg, Prince-Bishop of Minden, deposed or abdicated 1625, died 1633.
Franz Wilhelm von Wartenberg, Prince-Bishop of Minden, deposed 1648.

Mogulistan
Ismail, Ruler of Mogulistan 1669, 1670–1678 and 1679–1682.

Ottoman Empire
Sultan Mustafa I, Sultan of the Ottoman Empire (1617–1618, (1622–1623).
Sultan Muhammad IV Avji Ghazi, Sultan of the Ottoman Empire (1648–1687)

Pahang
Paduka Sri Sultan 'Ala' ud-din Ri'ayat Shah ibni al-Marhum Sultan 'Abdu'l Ghaffar Muhi ud-din Shah, Sultan of Pahang (1614–1615).
Paduka Sri Sultan 'Abdu'l Jalil Shah III ibni al-Marhum Sultan 'Ala' ud-din Ri'ayat Shah III, Sultan of Johor, Pahang and Lingga (1615–1617, 1623

Palatinate
Frederick V, Elector Palatine, deposed 1623

Palmares
Ganga Zumba Mocambo of Palmares, deposed and re-enslaved in 1680.
Zumbi, Mocambo of Palmares, deposed in 1694 and subsequently captured and beheaded.

Perak
Maulana Paduka Sri Sultan Mansur Shah II ibni al-Marhum Raja Kechil Lasa, Sultan of Perak (1619–1627)

Poland
John II Casimir, King of Poland, abdicated 1668

Portugal
Philip III, King of Portugal, deposed 1640
Afonso VI, King of Portugal, partially deposed 1667, although still considered as king until his death

Russia
Feodor II, Tsar of Russia, deposed 1605
Vasili IV, Tsar of Russia, deposed 1610

Scotland
Charles I, King of Scotland, lost the English Civil War and executed in 1649
Charles II, King of Scotland, deposed 1651, restored 1660
James VII, King of Scotland, considered to have ceased to reign from December 1688, officially deposed February 1689 in the Glorious Revolution

Sweden
Christina, Queen of Sweden, abdicated 1654

Taiwan
Zheng Keshuang, King of Tungning/Taiwan (Kingdom of Formosa/Kingdom of Tungning), surrendered to the Qing Manchu's aggression in 1683

Tulsipur
 Chauhan Raja Ram Krishna Singh ceased to be king of Tulsipur in 1675.

Trubczewsk
 Aleksy Trubczewski, Prince of Trubczewsk, deposed 1645

See also
List of monarchs who abdicated
List of monarchs who lost their thrones in the 19th century
List of monarchs who lost their thrones in the 18th century
List of monarchs who lost their thrones in the 16th century
List of monarchs who lost their thrones in the 15th century
List of monarchs who lost their thrones in the 14th century
List of monarchs who lost their thrones in the 13th century
List of monarchs who lost their thrones before the 13th century

References

17
 
Lists of 17th-century people